Ron Hansen  may refer to:

Ron Hansen (novelist) (born 1947), American novelist
Ron Hansen (politician) (born 1943), Canadian politician
Ron Hansen (baseball) (born 1938), baseball player
Ron Hansen (American football) (1932-1993)
Ron Hansen (jockey) (1960-1993), American jockey